The X-Men are a group of superheroes in the Marvel Comics universe. The X-Men first appeared in the self-titled X-Men comic, cover-dated September 1963. Due to the X-Men's immense popularity, Marvel has launched dozens of spin-off limited series.

Like Uncanny X-Men, most X-books feature mutants, humans born with extraordinary powers due to a genetic mutation. Some X-books feature mutant superhero teams while others feature solo adventures of characters who became popular in Uncanny X-Men or another X-book. Occasionally, X-books use mutants as a metaphor for racial, religious and other minorities oppressed by society.

For the purpose of this list, "X-Men miniseries" will be defined by the following criteria:
 The series was not meant to continue indefinitely. For ongoing titles, see List of X-Men comics.
 One-shot issues are included ("minus one" issues do not count).
 Graphic novels with original content are included. Reprints are not.
 The series featured mostly characters associated with and/or concepts originating in Uncanny X-Men or another X-book; thus The Defenders and The Champions, which featured both X-Men-related and non-X-Men-related characters will not be counted, and neither will series which occasionally featured X-Men characters, such as Marvel Comics Presents, Marvel Team-Up and What If?.



Graphic novels 
Dazzler: The Movie (1984)
Deadpool: Bad Blood (2017)
Excalibur: Weird War III (1990)
The New Mutants (1982)
Wolverine: Bloodlust (1990)
Wolverine: Bloody Choices (1991)
Wolverine/Nick Fury: The Scorpio Connection (1989)
X-Men: God Loves, Man Kills (1982)
X-Men: No More Humans (2014)

Main limited series

1970s

1980s

1990s

2000s

2010s

2020s

One-shots

0–9
100th Anniversary Special: X-Men (2014)

A
A-Babies vs X-Babies (2012)
Age of Apocalypse: The Chosen (1995)
Age of X Alpha (2011)
Age of X-Man: Alpha (2019)
Age of X-Man: Omega (2019)
All-New Exiles vs. X-Men (1995)
All-New Wolverine Saga (2010)
All-New X-Men Special (2013)
Alpha Flight Special vol. 2 (1992)
Alpha Flight: True North (2019)
Amazing Spider-Man and the X-Men in Arcade's Revenge (1992)
Amazon (1996) – Amalgam Comics title
Archangel (1996)
Astonishing Spider-Man & Wolverine: Another Fine Mess (2011) – collects Astonishing Spider-Man & Wolverine #1-3
Astonishing X-Men Saga (2006)
Astonishing X-Men Sketchbook (2008)
Astonishing X-Men/Amazing Spider-Man: The Gauntlet Sketchbook (2009)
Avengers & X-Men: Time Trouble (2006) – title on the cover is The New Avengers
Avengers vs X-Men Program (2012)
A.X.E.: Eve of Judgment (2022)
A.X.E.: Judgment Day Omega (2022)
A.X.E.: X-Men (2022)

B
Baby's First Deadpool Book (1998)
Badrock/Wolverine (1996)
Be X-Tra Safe with the X-Men (1996)
Black Knight: Exodus (1996)

C
Cable: Reloaded (2021)
Captain Universe/X-23 (2006) – "Chapter 3 in a 5-Part Epic"
Cerebro's Guide to the X-Men (1997)
Chaos War: Alpha Flight (2011)
Colossus (1997)
Cyberforce/X-Men (2007)
Cyclops vol. 2 (2011)

D
Daken: Dark Wolverine - Empire (2011) – collects Daken: Dark Wolverine #1-3
Dark Avengers/Uncanny X-Men: Exodus (2009)
Dark Avengers/Uncanny X-Men: Utopia (2009)
Dark Claw Adventures (1997) – Amalgam Comics title
Dark Reign: The List - Wolverine (2009)
Dark Reign: The List - X-Men (2009)
Dark X-Men: The Confession (2009)
Darkness/Wolverine (2006)
Dazzler (2010)
Dazzler: X-Song (2018)
Deadpool #0 (1998) Wizard #0 comic
Deadpool & Cable (#26) (2011)
Deadpool #1,000 (2010)
Deadpool #900 (2009)
Deadpool Bi-Annual (2014)
Deadpool Corps: Rank and Foul (2010)
Deadpool Family (2011)
Deadpool Max X-Mas Special (2012)
Deadpool Max: A History of Violence (2011)
Deadpool/GLI - Summer Fun Spectacular (2007)
Deadpool: Games of Death (2009)
Deadpool: Last Days of Magic (2016)
Deadpool Team-Up vol. 1 (1998)
Deadpool: The Gauntlet (2014)
Death of Doctor Strange: Black Knight/X-Men (2022)
Death of Wolverine: Captain America and Deadpool (2014)
Death of Wolverine: Life After Logan (2014)
Decimation: House of M—The Day After (2006)
Demon Days: Blood Feud (2022)
Demon Days: Cursed Web (2021)
Demon Days: Mariko (2021)
Demon Days: Rising Storm (2021)
Demon Days: X-Men (2021)

E
Encyclopedia Deadpoolica (1998)
Excalibur Special Edition (1988)
Excalibur: Air Apparent (1991)
Excalibur: Mojo Mayhem (1989)
Excalibur: The Possession (1991)
Excalibur: XX Crossing (1991)
Exiles: Days of Then and Now (2008)

F
Firestar vol. 2 (2010)
Free Comic Book Day 2003: Ultimate X-Men (2003)
Free Comic Book Day 2006: X-Men & Runaways (2006)
Free Comic Book Day 2008: X-Men (2008)
Free Comic Book Day 2009: Wolverine: Origin of an X-Man (2009)
Free Comic Book Day 2020: X-Men (2020)
Free Comic Book Day 2022: Avengers/X-Men (2022)

G
Gambit 1/2 (sometimes listed as 0.5) (one-shot) – Wizard mail-away exclusive
Gambit & Bishop: Genesis (2001)
Gambit and the Champions: From the Marvel Vault (2011)
Gambit and Bishop: Alpha (2001)
Generation Hex #1 (1997) – Amalgam Comics title
Generation X #1/2 (sometimes listed as #0.5) (date unknown) – Wizard mail-away exclusive
Generation X Collector's Preview (1994)
Generation X Holiday Special (1998)
Generation X Underground (1998)
Generation X/Gen¹³  (1997) – this comic also had a 3D edition
Generation X: Ashcan (1994)
Ghost Rider and Cable: Servants of the Dead (1991)
Ghost Rider/Wolverine/Punisher: Heart of Darkness (1991)
Ghost Rider/Wolverine/Punisher: The Dark Design (1994)
Giant Size X-Men 40th Anniversary (2015)
Giant-Size Astonishing X-Men (2008)
Giant-Size Wolverine (2006)
Giant-Size X-Men: Fantomex (2020)
Giant-Size X-Men: Jean Grey and Emma Frost (2020)
Giant-Size X-Men: Magneto (2020)
Giant-Size X-Men: Nightcrawler (2020)
Giant-Size X-Men: Storm (2020)
Giant-Size X-Men: Thunderbird (2022)
Giant-Size X-Men: Tribute To Wein & Cockrum (2020)
Giant-Sized Gambit (1999)
Giant-Sized X-Statix (2019)
Guardians of the Galaxy & X-Men: The Black Vortex Alpha (2015)
Guardians of the Galaxy & X-Men: The Black Vortex Omega (2015)

H
Heroes for Hope Starring the X-Men (1985)
Heroes Reborn: Magento and the X-Men (2021)
Heroes Reborn: Weapon X and Final Flight (2021)
Heroic Age: X-Men (2011)
Hotshots: X-Men (1995)
House of M Sketchbook (2005)
Hunt for Wolverine (2018)
Hunt for Wolverine: Dead Ends (2018)

I
Iceman & Angel (2011)
Incredible Hulk and Wolverine (1986)

J
Juggernaut vol. 1 (1997)
Juggernaut: The Eighth Day (1999)

K
King-Size Cable Spectacular (2008)
King in Black: Marauders (2021)

L
Lady Deadpool (2010)
Legends of the Dark Claw #1 (1996) – Amalgam Comics title
LEGO Marvel Super Heroes: Guardians of the Galaxy / LEGO Marvel Super Heroes: X-Men (2014) – mini-comic included with the following LEGO Sets: LEGO Guardians of the Galaxy #76019, 76020 & 76021 and LEGO X-Men #76022
Logan: Path of the Warlord (1996)
Logan: Shadow Society (1996)
Longshot vol. 2 (1998)

M
Magneto and the Magnetic Men (1996) – Amalgam Comics title
Magneto Ascendant (1999)
Magneto vol. 1 (1993)
Magneto vol. 3 (2011)
Marvel Collector's Edition vol. 2 (1993)
Marvel Comics Presents the X-Men (1988) – reprints X-Men (1963) #53
Marvel Girl (2011)
Marvel Legends: The Beast (2006)
Marvel Mangaverse: X-Men (2002)
Marvel Milestone Edition: Giant-Size X-Men (1997) – reprints Giant-Size X-Men #1
Marvel Milestone Edition: X-Men (3 one-shot issues, 1991, 1993 & 1994) – reprints X-Men vol. 1 (1963) #1, 9 & 28
Marvel Milestones: Beast & Kitty Pryde (2006) – reprints stories from Amazing Adventures (1970) #11 and Uncanny X-Men (1981) #153
Marvel Milestones: Onslaught (2006) – reprints Onslaught: Marvel Universe (1996)
Marvel Milestones: Ultimate Spider-Man, Ultimate X-Men, Microman & Mantor (2006) – reprints Ultimate Spider-Man #1/2, Ultimate X-Men #1/2, and Human Torch vol. 1 #2
Marvel Milestones: Wolverine, X-Men & Tuk: Caveboy (2005) – reprints Marvel Comics Presents #1, Uncanny X-Men #201 and Captain America Comics #1-2
Marvel Must Haves: Astonishing X-Men #1–3 (2004)
Marvel Must Haves: Ultimate X-Men #34–35 (2003)
Marvel Must Haves: Wolverine #1–3 (2003)
Marvel Must Haves: Wolverine #20–22 (2004)
Marvel Must Haves: Ultimate X-Men #1–3 (2003)
Marvel Spotlight: Deadpool (2009)
Marvel Spotlight: Heroes Reborn/Onslaught Reborn (2006)
Marvel Spotlight: New Mutants (2009)
Marvel Spotlight: Uncanny X-Men -  500 Issues (2008)
Marvel Spotlight: Wolverine (2009)
Marvel Spotlight: X-Men - Messiah Complex (2008)
Marvel Tales: Wolverine (2020)
Marvel Tales: X-Men (2019)
Marvel X-Men Collection (3 issues, 1994)
Marvel & DC Present (1982) – crossover featuring The Uncanny X-Men and The New Teen Titans
Marvel: Shadows & Light (1997)
Marvelous Adventures of Gus Beezer: X-Men (2003)
Marvels Comics: X-Men (2000)
Maverick (1997)
Merry X-Men Holiday Special (2018)
Ms. Marvel & Wolverine (2022)
Murderworld: Wolverine (2023)
Mutant 2099 (2004)
Mutant X: Dangerous Decisions (2002)
Mutant X: Origin (2002)
Mutants vs Ultras: First Encounters (1995)
Mythos: X-Men (2006)

N
New Mutants Saga (2009)
New Mutants Special Edition (1985)
New Mutants Summer Special (1990)
New Mutants: War Children (2019)
New X-Men: Academy X Yearbook (2005)
Night Man vs. Wolverine (1995)

O
Obnoxio the Clown (1983) – front cover has Obnoxio the Clown vs. the X-Men as the title
Official Handbook of the Marvel Universe: Wolverine 2004 (2004)
Official Handbook of the Marvel Universe: X-Men - Age of Apocalypse 2005 (2005)
Official Handbook of the Marvel Universe: X-Men 2004 (2004)
Official Handbook of the Marvel Universe: X-Men 2005 (2005)
Official Handbook of the Ultimate Marvel Universe 2005: The Ultimates & X-Men (2005)
Onslaught: Epilogue (1997)
Onslaught: Marvel Universe (1996)
Onslaught: X-Men (1996)
Origins of Marvel Comics: X-Men (2010)

P
Phoenix: Resurrection (1996)
Phoenix: Resurrection - Aftermath (1996)
Phoenix: Resurrection - Genesis (1995)
Phoenix: Resurrection - Revelations (1995)
Phoenix: The Untold Story (1984)
Pizza Hut Super Savings Book Featuring X-Men (1993) – giveaway item from Pizza Hut restaurants
Planet-Sized X-Men (2021)
The Pulse: Special Edition—House of M (2005)

R
Rampaging Wolverine (2009)

S
Sabretooth: Back to Nature (1997)
Sabretooth: Special (1995)
Secret X-Men (2022)
Secrets of the House of M (2005)
Sentry/X-Men (2001)
Sins of Sinister (2023)
Sins of Sinister: Dominion (2023)
Special Edition X-Men (1983) – reprints Giant-Size X-Men #1
Spider-Man and the New Mutants (1990)
Spider-Man vs. Wolverine (1987)
Spider-Man/Punisher/Sabretooth: Designer Genes (1993)
Spider-Man, Firestar & Iceman (1983)
Spider-Man, Firestar & Iceman at the Dallas Ballet Nutcracker (1983)
Spidey/Marrow (2001)
Star Trek/X-Men (1996)
Star Trek/X-Men: Second Contact (1998)
Strong Guy Reborn (1997)
Stryfe's Strike File (1993)

T
Taco Bell/X-Men (2011)
Tales from the Age of Apocalypse (1996)
Tales from the Age of Apocalypse: Sinister Bloodlines (1997)
Target X-Men and Power Pack (2006)
Target X-Men Encyclopedia (2005)
Target X-Men: First Class - New Beginnings (2007)
Team X 2000 (1999)
Team X/Team 7 (1997)
The Exciting X-Patrol (1997) – Amalgam Comics title
The Magnetic Men featuring Magneto (1997) – Amalgam Comics title
Timestorm 2009/2099: X-Men One-Shot (2009) – Timestorm tie-in
True Believers: Age of Apocalypse (2015)
True Believers: All-New Wolverine (2017)
True Believers: Astonishing X-Men #1 (2017)
True Believers: Cable & The New Mutants #1 (2017)
True Believers: Deadpool - Deadpool vs. Sabretooth (2016)
True Believers: Deadpool (2016)
True Believers: Deadpool - Origins (2016)
True Believers: Deadpool - The Musical (2016)
True Believers: Deadpool - The Variants (2016)
True Believers: Death of Phoenix (2017)
True Believers: Detective Deadpool (2016)
True Believers: Enter the Phoenix (2017)
True Believers: Evil Deadpool (2016)
True Believers: Extraordinary X-Men - Burning Man (2016)
True Believers: Generation X #1 (2017)
True Believers: Giant-Size X-Men #1 (2017)
True Believers: New Mutants #1 (2017)
True Believers: Old Man Logan (2015)
True Believers: Phoenix - Bizarre Adventures (2017)
True Believers: Phoenix Classic (2017)
True Believers: Phoenix featuring Cyclops & Marvel Girl (2017)
True Believers: Phoenix - Origins (2017)
True Believers: Phoenix Returns (2017)
True Believers: Phoenix vs. Sabretooth (2017)
True Believers: Phoenix - The Wedding (2017)
True Believers: Phoenix - What If? (2017)
True Believers: The Groovy Deadpool (2016)
True Believers: The Meaty Deadpool (2016)
True Believers: The Wedding of Deadpool (2016)
True Believers: Uncanny Deadpool (2016)
True Believers: What If Legion Had Killed Magneto? (2018)
True Believers: Wolverine - Enemy of The State (2017)
True Believers: Wolverine - Old Man Logan (2017)
True Believers: Wolverine - Origin (2017)
True Believers: Wolverine - Weapon X (2017)
True Believers: Wolverine - X-23 (2017)
True Believers: Wolverine (2017)
True Believers: Wolverine and The X-Men (2017)
True Believers: Wolverine vs. Hulk (2017)
True Believers: Wolverine: Save the Tiger (2017)
True Believers: X-Factor - Mutant Genesis #1 (2017)
True Believers: X-Force #1 (2017)
True Believers: X-Men #1 (2017)
True Believers: X-Men – Apocalypse #1 (2019)
True Believers: X-Men – Besty Braddock #1 (2019)
True Believers: X-Men – Bishop #1 (2019)
True Believers: X-Men – Cypher #1 (2020)
True Believers: X-Men – Empath #1 (2020)
True Believers: X-Men – Havok #1 (2020)
True Believers: X-Men – Jubilee #1 (2019)
True Believers: X-Men – Karima Shapandar, Omega Sentinel #1 (2019)
True Believers: X-Men – Kitty Pryde & Emma Frost #1 (2019)
True Believers: X-Men – Kwannon #1 (2019)
True Believers: X-Men – Magik #1 (2020)
True Believers: X-Men – Mister Sinister #1 (2020)
True Believers: X-Men – Moira MacTaggert #1 (2019)
True Believers: X-Men – Nanny & Orphan Maker #1 (2020)
True Believers: X-Men – Pyro #1 (2019)
True Believers: X-Men – Rictor #1 (2019)
True Believers: X-Men – Saturnyne #1 (2020)
True Believers: X-Men – Scalphunter #1 (2020)
True Believers: X-Men – Soulsword #1 (2020)
True Believers: X:Men – Saturnyne #1 (2020)
True Believers: X-Men Blue #1 (2017)
True Believers: X-Men Gold #1 (2017)
Typhoid Fever: X-Men #1 (2018)

U
Ultimate Comics X-Men Must Have (2012) – reprints Ultimate Comics X-Men #1–3
Ultimate Spider-Man/Ultimate X-Men vol. 1 (2009)
Ultimate X-Men vol. 2 (2001)
Ultimate X-Men: Collected Edition (2001) – reprints Ultimate X-Men #1–3
Ultimatum: X-Men Requiem (2009)
Uncanny X-Force: Apocalypse Solution (2011)
Uncanny X-Men at the State Fair of Texas (1983)
Uncanny X-Men Special (2014)
Uncanny X-Men Winter Special (UK) (1981) – Marvel UK comic
Uncanny X-Men: First Class Giant-Sized Special (2009)
Uncanny X-Men: NFL Pro Action Giveaway Insert Comic (1994)
Uncanny X-Men: The Heroic Age (2010)
Uncanny X-Men: Winter's End (2019)
Unforgiven: X-Men (2022)

W
Wakanda Forever: X-Men (2018)
Wastelanders: Wolverine (2021)
Weapon X Noir (2010)
Weapon X: The Draft - Agent Zero (2002)
Weapon X: The Draft - Kane (2002)
Weapon X: The Draft - Marrow (2002)
Weapon X: The Draft - Sauron (2002)
Weapon X: The Draft - Wild Child (2002)
Weapons of Mutant Destruction: Alpha (2017)
What If? Magik (2018)
What If? X-Men (2018)
WildC.A.T.s/X-Men: The Dark Age (1998) – this comic was also printed in 3D
WildC.A.T.s/X-Men: The Golden Age (1997) – this comic was also printed in 3D
WildC.A.T.s/X-Men: The Modern Age (1997) – this comic was also printed in 3D
WildC.A.T.s/X-Men: The Silver Age (1997) – this comic was also printed in 3D
Witchblade/Wolverine (2004)
Wizard X-Men Pre-Press Edition (2001)
Wolverine #1/2 (sometimes listed as #0.5) (date unknown) – Wizard mail-away exclusive
Wolverine and Captain America: Weapon Plus (2019)
Wolverine and Ghost Rider in Acts of Vengeance (1993)
Wolverine Art Appreciation (2009)
Wolverine Battles the Incredible Hulk (1989)
Wolverine Comic Reader (2013) – reprints Wolverine: First Class #2 and material from Wolverine and Power Pack #1
Wolverine Halloween Special Edition (1993)
Wolverine Saga vol. 2 (2009)
Wolverine Special: Firebreak One-Shot (2008)
Wolverine vs. Blade (2019)
Wolverine vs. Spider-Man (1995)
Wolverine and Cable: Guts & Glory (1999)
Wolverine and Deadpool: Decoy (2011)
Wolverine/Nick Fury: Scorpio Rising (1994)
Wolverine/Cable (1999)
Wolverine/Deadpool: The Decoy (2011)
Wolverine/Shi: Dark Night of Judgment (2000)
Wolverine: Best There Is - Contagion (2011) – collects Wolverine: The Best There Is #1-3
Wolverine: Black Rio (1998)
Wolverine: Bloodlust (1990)
Wolverine: Bloody Choices (1993)
Wolverine: Carni-Brawl (2010) – this is a digital comic
Wolverine: Chop Shop (2008)
Wolverine: Danger on the Docks (1993) – #2 of Drake's Cakes four-issue series of mini-comics.
Wolverine: Dangerous Games (2008)
Wolverine: Debt of Death (2011)
Wolverine: Doombringer (1997)
Wolverine: Evilution (1994)
Wolverine: Exit Wounds (2019)
Wolverine: Flies to a Spider (2008)
Wolverine: Giant-Size Old Man Logan (2009)
Wolverine: Global Jeopardy (1993)
Wolverine: In the Flesh (2013)
Wolverine: Inner Fury (1992)
Wolverine: Killing Made Simple (2008)
Wolverine: Killing (1993)
Wolverine: Knight of Terra (1995)
Wolverine: Mr. X (2010)
Wolverine: Rahne of Terra (1992)
Wolverine: Revolver (2009)
Wolverine: Road to Hell (2010)
Wolverine: Saudade (2008)
Wolverine: Savage (2010)
Wolverine: Save the Tiger! (1992)x
Wolverine: Son of Canada (2001)
Wolverine: Switchback (2009)
Wolverine: The Amazing Immortal Man and Other Bloody Stories (2008)
Wolverine: The Anniversary (2009)
Wolverine: The Jungle Adventure (1990)
Wolverine: The Nuke Hunters (1994) – #4 in a five-issue mini-comic series giveaway by Drake's Cakes
Wolverine: Under the Boardwalk (2009)
Wolverine: Weapon X Files (2009)
Wolverine: Wendigo (2010)
Wolverine: Wolverine Goes to Hell (2011) – reprints Wolverine #1–3

X
X-23 vol 2. (2010)
X-23: The Killing Dream (2011) – collects X-23 vol. 3 #1–3
Xavier Institute Alumni Yearbook (1996)
X-Babies: Murderama (1998)
X-Babies: Reborn (2000)
X-Factor Special: Layla Miller (2008)
X-Factor: Prisoner of Love (1990)
X-Factor: The Quick and the Dead (2008)
X-Force & Spider-Man: Sabotage (1992)
X-Force Megazine (1996)
X-Force Special: Ain't No Dog (2009)
X-Force/Cable: Messiah War (2009)
X-Force/Youngblood (1996) – second part of a two-part crossover; Part 1 is: Youngblood/X-Force
X-Force: Legacy of Vengeance (2008)
X-Force: Killshot (2021)
X-Man: All Saints Day (1997)
X-Men #1/2 (Sometimes listed as #0.5) (date unknown) – Wizard mail-away exclusive
X-Men 2 Movie (2003)
X-Men 2 Prequel: Nightcrawler (2003)
X-Men 2 Prequel: Wolverine (2003)
X-Men 2099 Special (1995)
X-Men 2099: Oasis (1996)
X-Men Alpha (1995)
X-Men and Captain Universe: Sleeping Giants (1994) – this was a mail-away custom comic where your name was printed in the comic
X-Men and Moon Girl (2022)
X-Men Animation Special: The Pryde of the X-Men (1990)
X-Men Archives Sketchbook (2000)
X-Men Black: Emma Frost (2018)
X-Men Black: Juggernaut (2018)
X-Men Black: Magneto (2018)
X-Men Black: Mojo (2018)
X-Men Black: Mystique (2018)
X-Men Easter Special (UK) (1992) Marvel UK comic
X-Men Evolutions (2011)
X-Men First Class Magazine (2011)
X-Men Firsts (1996)
X-Men Forever Giant-Size (2010)
X-Men Giant-Size (2011)
X-Men Gold (2014)
X-Men iConnect Edition (2001) – free comic sent to new subscribers of Marvel's ISP "marvelonline.net"
X-Men Interactive Comic Book (1996)
X-Men Legends II: Rise of Apocalypse (2005)
X-Men Movie Adaptation (2000)
X-Men Movie Prequel: Magneto (2000)
X-Men Movie Prequel: Rogue (2000)
X-Men Movie Prequel: Wolverine (2000)
X-Men Movie Special Edition (2000)
X-Men Movie Special Premiere Prequel Edition (2000)
X-Men Mutant Search R.U. 1? (1998)
X-Men Omega (1995)
X-Men Origins: Beast (2008)
X-Men Origins: Colossus (2008)
X-Men Origins: Cyclops (2010)
X-Men Origins: Deadpool (2010)
X-Men Origins: Emma Frost (2010)
X-Men Origins: Gambit (2009)
X-Men Origins: Iceman (2010)
X-Men Origins: Jean Grey (2008)
X-Men Origins: Nightcrawler (2010)
X-Men Origins: Sabretooth (2009)
X-Men Origins: Wolverine (2009)
X-Men Prelude to Perdition (1995)
X-Men Premium Edition (1993) – Toys R Us promo comic
X-Men Prime (1995)
X-Men Revolution Genesis Edition (2000)
X-Men Seventy-Five Cent Ashcan Edition (1994)
X-Men Spotlight (2011)
X-Men Spring Special (UK) (1994) Marvel UK comic
X-Men Summer Special (UK) (1995) Marvel UK comic
X-Men the Movie Special Edition (2000)
X-Men Ultra III Preview (1995)
X-Men Universe: Past, Present and Future (1999)
X-Men Unlimited: Latitude (2022) – collects X-Men Unlimited Infinity Comics #1–4
X-Men vs. Dracula (1993)
X-Men vs. Hulk (2009)
X-Men Yearbook 1999 (2000)
X-Men/Alpha Flight: The Gift (1998)
X-Men: Age of Apocalypse One-Shot (2005)
X-Men: Ashcan (1994)
X-Men: Blind Science (2010)
X-Men: Books of Askani (1995)
X-Men: Children of the Atom vol. 2 (2005) – reprints X-Men (1963) #1–3
X-Men: Curse of the Man-Thing (2021)
X-Men: Curse of the Mutants - Blade (2010)
X-Men: Curse of the Mutants - Smoke and Blood (2010)
X-Men: Curse of the Mutants - Storm & Gambit (2010)
X-Men: Curse of the Mutants Saga (2010)
X-Men: Curse of the Mutants Spotlight (2011)
X-Men: Declassified (2000)
X-Men: Earthfall (1996)
X-Men: Earth's Mutant Heroes (2011)
X-Men: Endangered Species (2007)
X-Men: Evolution vol. 2 (2002) – reprints X-Men: Evolution #1-2
X-Men: First Class Giant-Size Special (2008)
X-Men: First Class Special (2007)
X-Men: Future History - The Messiah War Sourcebook (2009)
X-Men: Gold (2013)
X-Men: Halloween Special Edition (1993)
X-Men: Hellfire Gala (2022)
X-Men: Hope (2010)
X-Men: Life Lessons (2003)
X-Men: Manifest Destiny - Nightcrawler (2009)
X-Men: Marvel Snapshots (2020)
X-Men: Messiah Complex - Mutant Files (2008)
X-Men: NFL Pro Action Giveaway Insert Comic (1994) – issue is #2, issues #1 & #3 are Spider-Man Insert Comics
X-Men: Odd Men Out (2008)
X-Men: Original Sin (2008)
X-Men: Phoenix Force Handbook (2010)
X-Men: Pixies and Demons Director's Cut (2008)
X-Men: Regenesis (2011)
X-Men: Return of Magik Must Have (2008)
X-Men: Road to Onslaught (1996)
X-Men: Siege and Destroy (1994) – Part 5 in a five-part Drake's Cakes giveaway
X-Men: Survival Guide to the Mansion (1993)
X-Men: Sword of the Braddocks (2009)
X-Men: The 198 Files (2006)
X-Men: The Coming Of Triplikill (1994)
X-Men: The Exterminated (2018)
X-Men: The Magneto War (1999)
X-Men: The Onslaught Revelation (2021)
X-Men: The Wedding Album (1994)
X-Men: The Wedding Special (2018)
X-Men: With Great Power (2011)
X-Men: Wrath of Apocalypse (1996)
X-Men: Year of the Mutants Collector's Preview (1995)
X-Men Unlimited: Latitude (2022) – collects X-Men Unlimited Infinity Comics #1–4
X-Patrol 1996) – Amalgam Comics title
X-Women (2010)
X of Swords: Creation (2020)
X of Swords: Destructiom (2020)
X of Swords: Stasis (2020)
X of Swords Handbook (2020)

Y
Youngblood/X-Force (1996) – first part of a two-part crossover; Part 2 is: X-Force/Youngblood

See also
 List of X-Men comics
List of Marvel Comics publications

References

 X-Men
 X-Men
Limited series and one-shots